The Cerritos Center for the Performing Arts (or CCPA) is a  entertainment and music venue located in the Cerritos Towne Center of Cerritos, California. It is owned and operated by the City of Cerritos and it opened its doors to the public on January 9, 1993, and hosts opera, cabaret, jazz, dance, magic, drama, musicals and comedy performances as well as private functions. Its season runs from August of one year to May of the following year.

History and architecture
Plans for the construction of a community theater had been proposed in the Cerritos Towne Center since 1986, however, debate as to the size and influence of the theater vis-à-vis other venues in Southern California persisted. Fears primarily included having a large theater with few patrons in attendance.

The consultants, David Staples and Wally Russell of Theatre Projects Consultants  from London, calmed fears and inspired city leaders with the details of Derngate Theatre in Northampton, England, where blocks of seats on rollers could be rearranged or removed completely, tailored to each performance. At the time, nothing like it existed in the United States.

Architects Barton Myers Associates of Los Angeles were hired to design a similar marvel for Cerritos. Once worries were abated, it was decided that a large venue that could compete with the likes of the Long Beach Terrace Theater, Orange County Performing Arts Center, and the Los Angeles Music Center would be a better direction for the development of the community theater. In 1987, the layout plans included an auditorium with six distinct seating configurations, a  conference center and a 200-seat theater with its own sound and lighting systems. Construction began shortly on a city landmark that incorporates glass walls, pink limestone, colorful ceramic tiles and angular points and projections. A glass elevator tower topped with pyramids, thin spires and pennants completed the final façade. The interior includes a lobby featuring a curved grand staircase with etched glass, stylish fireplace, soaring ceiling and artwork. Though initially budgeted $17 million for the development, the final price tag came out to be over $60 million.

More than 6,000 visitors attended the open house tours upon the CCPA's completion. With a $4 million spending budget to attract performances in its inaugural season, the CCPA's sold out opening night welcomed crooner Frank Sinatra for three nights, helping establish the Cerritos Center as a premier venue in the Southland.

The city council realized that it would take several seasons to build up an audience to make the Cerritos Center self-supporting, so a $2 million subsidy or pump-priming fund was budgeted to augment the annual $3 million from ticket sales and pay operating costs and performers.

Seating configurations
There are six seating configurations in the  auditorium of the CCPA, made possible by moving seating towers and mobile seating wagons, multiple floor lifts and moving ceiling panels. It takes about eight hours or less to switch from one configuration to another.

Arena - A 1,691 to 1,721-seat arena setting with 500 floor seats surrounded by box seats and balconies on one side for popular music, comedy and jazz performances. 
Cabaret - A 1,324 to 1,504-seat cabaret setting with up to 67 tables and 412 chairs on a flat floor, surrounded by box seats and balconies, for jazz and other music performances. 
Concert - A 1,493 to 1,629-seat concert hall with in-the-round seating and acoustic concert ceiling panels for orchestras, recitals and acoustic performances. 
Drama - A 921 to 1,083-seat proscenium theater for plays, recitals and chamber music performances. 
In the Round - A 1,845 to 1,934-seat in-the-round theater for popular music, comedy and jazz performances. 
Lyric - A 1,311 to 1,391-seat proscenium theater for musical theater, dance and popular music performances.

Facilities
The Sierra Room/Sierra Theater at the Cerritos Center for the Performing Arts features a technologically advanced grid of tracks and moveable partitions, which can divide the  space from one large open room to five smaller meeting places. A hidden retractable seating unit can be opened into part of the room creating the Sierra Room Theater, perfect for fashion shows, guest speakers and presentations. Additional amenities available include a state-of-the-art sound system, lighting and a dance floor for parties and wedding receptions. 

The Mojave Room as well as the Grand Lobby can be rented out for small business meetings, luncheons and receptions.

Awards and recognition
1993-2001 Amusement Business Magazine Top 10 Venues - 5,000 seats or less in the United States.
1995 Performance Magazine "Theater of the Year"
1994 United States Institute of Theater Technology Honor Award
1993 Concrete Industry Paving Award
1993 Cabrillo Chapter of American Institute of Architects Design Award

In 1994, the CCPA received the United States Institute of Theater Technology's (USITT) highest honor, hailing the theater as "The most sophisticated project we've seen in terms of architecture, technology and urban design." Performance Magazine also acknowledged the center's accomplishments, naming it the number one theater in California (under 3,000 seats) for the third consecutive year.

See also
Cerritos, California
Cerritos Auto Square
Cerritos Millennium Library
Cerritos Senior Center at Pat Nixon Park
Cerritos Towne Center
Los Cerritos Center

External links
 Cerritos Center for the Performing Arts
 City of Cerritos

References

Eftychiou, A., & Cenovich, M. (2006). Cerritos at 50: celebrating our past and our future. Virginia Beach, VA: The Donning Company Publishers.
History and design. (n.d.). Retrieved July 8, 2006, from https://web.archive.org/web/20070917131734/http://www.cerritoscenter.com/history.cfm
Mojave Room. (n.d.). Retrieved July 8, 2006, from https://web.archive.org/web/20060615184304/http://cerritoscenter.com/mojave.cfm
Sierra Room/Sierra Theater. (n.d.). Retrieved July 8, 2006, from https://web.archive.org/web/20060615184318/http://cerritoscenter.com/sierra.cfm

Cerritos, California
Music venues in California
Performing arts centers in California
Theatres in Los Angeles County, California
Culture of Los Angeles
Barton Myers buildings
Tourist attractions in Los Angeles County, California